In mathematics, André planes are a class of finite translation planes found by André. The Desarguesian plane and the Hall planes are examples of André planes; the two-dimensional regular nearfield planes are also André planes.

Construction

Using this quasifield to construct a plane yields an André plane.

Properties
 André planes exist for all proper prime powers  with  prime and  a positive integer greater than one.
 Non-Desarguesian André planes exist for all proper prime powers except for  where  is prime.

Small Examples
For planes of order 25 and below, classification of Andrè planes is a consequence of either theoretical calculations or computer searches which have determined all translation planes of a given order:

 The smallest non-Desarguesian André plane has order 9, and it is isomorphic to the Hall plane of that order.
 The translation planes of order 16 have all been classified, and again the only non-Desarguesian André plane is the Hall plane.
 There are three non-Desarguesian André planes of order 25. These are the Hall plane, the regular nearfield plane, and a third plane not constructible by other techniques.
 There is a single non-Desarguesian André plane of order 27.

Enumeration of Andrè planes specifically has been performed for other small orders:

References

Finite geometry